Sverok – Spelkulturförbundet (The Swedish Gaming Federation) is a Swedish nationwide umbrella organization for gaming clubs. Sverok is one of Sweden's largest youth organizations and has 55,000 members in 1,700 clubs across the country.

What the clubs do
Member clubs vary in size from five to tens of thousands. The vast majority of clubs consist of between five and 50 people, meet somewhat regularly and play the games of their liking. The nature of the activities, and hence, clubs, vary greatly, spanning both indoors and outdoors activities, with or without computers, with or without propping equipment... in short, the span is huge. This is one thing that differentiates Sverok from other national gaming organizations - more than one branch of gaming is represented.

Some clubs organize bigger events such as gaming conventions, larps, LAN parties or other events related to their interest.

Funding and economy of Sverok
Any sufficiently large – 3000 members or more – youth organization organized in a democratic manner is eligible to receive government funding to cover operating expenses. Historically (pre 2001) this has been calculated from the amount of activity generated in the member clubs. Since 2001 it is instead based on the number of member clubs and the headcount they represent.

All in all 106 organizations receive this governmental support - this includes both party political organizations, local branches of international organizations such as Red Cross youth organization and the Scouts, disabilities youth organizations and more hobby related organizations such as Sverok. Notably, it does not include sport organizations.

The 2015 governmental support was approximately 10 000 000 SEK. Half of this sum is used to cover administration costs, basic democratic functions, insurances for members while engaging in their hobby and so forth. The remainder – a stated target has traditionally been at least 50% – is paid directly to the member clubs, the sums varying in size according to the number of members.

The districts of Sverok receive funding directly from their respective counties and is not included in the above tally (although there are exceptions). The amount of support received and reasons for receiving it varies from county to county. The densely populated ones have well over €50 000 (Stockholm over €100 000) while the more rural areas tend to hand out less funding. This funding cover administration, basic democratic functions and support to local clubs in ways appropriate for the region.

Organisation
Sverok is organized in a democratic fashion. The member clubs form the member base and all activity good and proper is performed by them. The districts and the national organization generally do not organize gaming events by themselves, rather opting to support local projects (the districts) or the clubs in general by means of funding, services and lobbying (the national organization).

How a club is run is entirely up to the club as long as it's organized in a democratic fashion and is open for anyone to become a member.

The annual general meeting of the national organization is held in November or December each year. Anyone can nominate representatives to the meeting. The clubs vote for these representatives as they see fit and a total of 101 representatives with voting power are elected. A board (with 9 members, currently as of 2015) is elected during the general meeting. Also, a budget is set and delegates discuss issues they deem to be important.

The annual general meeting of the districts are fairly similar but on a regional level. Generally there's no nomination process – clubs are allowed to show up with a number of representatives with voting power (and traditionally, whoever else feels like showing up), the number based on their headcount.

Also, the clubs are, as democratic entities, also required to have annual general meetings.

The districts
Sverok has 12 districts, together covering the entire country of Sweden. The organization isn't really 'made up of' these districts; rather, they are as independent as can be while still being part of the national mother organization. The constitution of each district is in part controlled by the national organization – mainly, the purpose of the district and its membership base, (all the members of Sverok within the geographic area the district encompasses). The districts themselves are democratic entities, whose boards are chosen directly by the members of each particular district – just as the national organization is chosen directly by members nationwide. The districts are, in geographical order, north to south:

 Sverok Norrbotten, Norrbottens län
 Sverok Västerbotten, Västerbottens län.
 Sverok Nedre Norrland, Västernorrlands and Jämtlands län.
 Sverok GävleDala, Dalarnas and Gävleborgs län.
 Sverok Svealand, Värmlands and Örebro län.
 Sverok Mälardalen, Södermanlands, Uppsala and Västmanlands län.
 Sverok Stockholm, Stockholms and Gotlands län.
 Sverok Östergötland, Östergötlands län.
 Sverok Jönköping-Kronoberg, Jönköpings and Kronobergs län.
 Sverok Kalmar-Blekinge, Kalmar län and Blekinge län.
 Sverok Väst, Västra Götalands and Hallands län.
 Sverok Skåne, Skåne län.

The board members are all volunteers and do not receive any financial reimbursement for their work. Depending on the district, they're responsible for an annual budget of €6 500 to €100 000.

Some districts also have staff, a regional consultant, who are a part of a new initiative that began in August 2014. Their role is to aid the board members in their district, help local clubs and work with the coordination of activities in the district.

How the money is spent differs greatly. Members in some (often rather densely populated) parts of the country prefer manned offices. Other districts are spread out in such a fashion that it's nearly impossible to keep a central office; hence their organization is a lot more virtual by nature.  Apart from rent and salaries, common ways to spend the money include subsidized trips to big gaming events, monetary support for local events and cheap-or-free storage or rental of equipment, among other things.  Due to the very nature of this arrangement, things have a tendency to come and go —some years a particular district finds it fit to print a member magazine, other years not.

Sverok Stockholm also has the means to print books, flyers, batch duplicate CDs and do DTP work in preparation thereof.

History and pre-history of Sverok
Sweden has a long history when it comes to gaming and role-playing. In 1972, the oldest member organization in Sverok was founded: Forodrim, in Stockholm.  In 1976, GothCon (the oldest still-active gaming convention in the world) took place for the first time. Gamers in Gothenburg gathered over Easter to play games and generally congregate. Another notable convention is LinCon.

In 1982, the first Swedish RPG was published: Drakar och Demoner, based on Basic Role Playing. The title translates to "Dragons and Demons", and in Sweden, it has the same status and recognition as "Dungeons & Dragons" has in English-speaking countries. During the 1980s, the role-playing and board gaming hobby grew to larger proportions. Several new gaming conventions popped up in various parts of the country, some of which are still active. Numerous gaming clubs were formed as well. In Sweden, most counties give support to youth clubs of a decent size. By uniting the local gamers, many clubs got free or cheap places to keep their equipment and play their games.

Sverok was founded in late 1988 to act as an umbrella organization for the various gaming clubs. During the early years numerous existing gaming clubs joined Sverok and a push by the organization was also made to generate new clubs – by informing youths about how to go about it. Since forming a club and joining Sverok meant receiving funds (rather than paying a membership fee) many teenagers saw it as a good way of getting some gaming supplements essentially for free. The only real requirements were – and are – that the clubs need to be open for members and organized in a democratic fashion. From a governmental perspective, this ensures that a large number of people are involved in a democratic process early on in life. During these early years much of the organizing of the federation itself was done on a volunteer basis.

Another important reason for gamers to unite was strength in numbers. What was previously seen as a niche phenomena turned more and more mainstream as the organization gained members. This proved useful in the mid-1990s when claims about role-playing being detrimental to the mental health of youth and links to satanism gained a fair amount of media attention, calling for a ban on tabletop role-playing games or at the very least cut funding for Sverok. Already having gained a large following, Sverok was able to stand as a counterpart to these claims in TV debates and newspaper opinion pages.

By 1997, Sverok had a member base of over 20 000. It eventually declined somewhat to about 16 000 in 2001 (a nationwide slump in youth organization membership in general) when another push for more exposure and encouraging members to form new clubs was coordinated alongside a crucial change in the basis for government support money carried the official headcount over 100 000 in 2005. Today (as of December 2014) Sverok have approximately 80 000 members in 1200 clubs. 16 people are currently working in administration and special projects such as NAB (Norms, attitudes and behaviours) and Respect All, Compete (for a more welcoming climate in e-sports).

Games played by members
board games
role-playing games
larp (sometimes included in role-playing games)
airsoft
paintball
video games
card games
miniature games
 cosplay
 Speculative fiction

Naturally, not all types of games are played by every individual club; some only play one or two while others play all of them.

External links
Sverok - Official site

Youth organizations based in Sweden
Role-playing game associations
Organizations established in 1988